James Frederick Richard "Dick" Sargeant (born 17 March 1936 in Kobe, Japan) is an Australian sailor and Olympic Champion. He competed at the 1964 Summer Olympics in Tokyo and won a gold medal in the 5.5 metre class.

Prior to Tokyo, Dick had been a crewman on Gretel, the Australian challenger for the 1962 America's Cup. After Tokyo, Dick continued his involvement with the Australian and international sailing world during the ensuing decades.  He competed at Mexico City 1968 Olympics, where he and Carl Ryves sailed their Flying Dutchman class boat into fourth place, an agonising 0.7 points off a medal.

In 2017, he was an inaugural inductee Australian Sailing Hall of Fame with Bill Northam and Peter O'Donnell.

References

External links
 
 
 
 

1936 births
Living people
Australian male sailors (sport)
Sailors at the 1964 Summer Olympics – 5.5 Metre
Sailors at the 1968 Summer Olympics – Flying Dutchman
Olympic sailors of Australia
Olympic gold medalists for Australia
Olympic medalists in sailing
Medalists at the 1964 Summer Olympics
1962 America's Cup sailors
1974 America's Cup sailors
20th-century Australian people